The Imperial County Superior Court is the California superior court located in Imperial County. The superior court operates four courthouses throughout the county. , the presiding judge of the court is Brooks Anderholt, and the interim court executive officer is Maria Rhinehart. The court has over 100 employees, 10 judges, and 2 subordinate judicial officers. The building is 20 feet tall and about 100 feet wide. It has a budget of approximately $13.9 million, for the 2017–18 fiscal year.

History and courthouses

The original Imperial County courthouse was built in 1908 in the City of El Centro. The current Imperial County courthouse was subsequently built upon a "five acre tract" of donated land in the City of El Centro on West Main St. The courthouse was completed in 1924 and designed by architects Ralph Emerson Swearingen and Don W. Wells.  The original courthouse is currently still in use nearly ninety-five years later.   

The courthouse was substantially damaged during a 2010 earthquake which affected much of Imperial County.

Judicial officers
The current judicial officers of the Imperial County Superior Court are Hon. Brooks Anderholt (Presiding Judge), Hon. Jeffrey Jones (Civil Presiding Judge), Hon. William Lehman (Juvenile and Family Law Presiding Judge), Hon. Poli Flores, Hon. Eran Bermudez, Hon. Michael Domenzain, Hon. Marco Nunez, Hon. Monica Lepe-Negrete, Hon. Kris Becker (Commissioner), and Hon. Martin Gonzalez (Referee).

See also 
 Superior Courts of California

References

External links

Government of Imperial County, California
Superior courts in California